Universal Technical Institute, Inc. (UTI) is a private for-profit system of technical colleges throughout the United States. The school offers specialized technical education programs under the banner of several brands, including Universal Technical Institute (UTI), Motorcycle Mechanics Institute and Marine Mechanics Institute (MMI), MIAT College of Technology (MIAT), and NASCAR Technical Institute (NTI).

History
Universal Technical Institute was founded in 1965. UTI expanded its programs with additional curricula and opened new campuses, growing internally and through acquisitions. To address the needs of industry and corporate clients, UTI started providing continuing education and training for technicians in 1980. In 1983, UTI opened a campus in Houston, Texas. In 1988 UTI opened their Lisle, Illinois, campus. In 1998, it opened a campus in Rancho Cucamonga, California.

In January 1998, UTI acquired Clinton Harley Corporation and Clinton Education Group, Inc. for $26.3 million. Motorcycle Mechanics Institute and Marine Mechanics Institute (MMI) were operating divisions of Clinton Harley Corporation.

In June 1998, UTI acquired National Technology Transfer, Inc. (NTT) and Performance Training Associates (PTA). NTT provided intensive training seminars to technicians in sectors similar to the sectors that they served. PTA organized lecture training seminars in markets similar to NTT. The acquisition of NTT and PTA was completed for approximately $50.2 million. The NTT business was discontinued at a loss of $42.9 million. At the time of its initial public offering, UTI carried a debt load of $57.3 million.

At its peak in 2011, UTI had more than 18,000 students. Enrollment has been declining since then.

The 2012 Harkin Commission noted that: "Compared to public colleges offering the same programs, the price of tuition is significantly higher at UTI....The same Certificate costs almost 20 times more at UTI than it does at the public college." UTI's default rate, however, was relatively low for a for-profit college, fluctuating from 12% to 16%.

While Universal Technical Institute in the past had limited access to military bases for student recruitment, as of 2021 it operates BMW MSTEP at Ft. Bragg, N.C. and Marine Corps Base Camp Pendleton, Calif., and Premier Truck Group Technician Training at Ft. Bliss in Texas.

On September 27, 2016, UTI reported that its president and CFO, Eugene Putnam, was removed as part of a financial improvement plan and that Kim McWaters replaced him as president. October 21, 2019, Kim McWaters resigned as CEO of Universal Technical Institute. Jerome Grant was named CEO in 2019.

On Nov. 1, 2021, UTI announced it had completed the acquisition of MIAT College of Technology, On June 9, 2022, the company announced plans to add 15 new programs across its national UTI/MIAT campus footprint. On Dec. 1, 2022, UTI announced it had closed on the acquisition of Concorde Career Colleges, Inc., which was announced on May 3, 2022 UTI and Concorde Career Colleges together now serve 20,000+ students across 14 states and 33 locations. Concorde Career Colleges offers more than 20 programs across the Allied Health, Dental, Nursing, Patient Care, and Diagnostic fields.

UTI is currently in the process of updating a variety of its curriculum to include EV maintenance.

Enrollment and campus locations
Since December 2018, Universal Technical Institute has seen a significant drop in the number of students enrolled. In Spring of 2022, UTI opened the Austin, Texas campus. A planned Miramar, Florida campus opened in Summer of 2022.

References

External links
 Official website

Automotive industry in the United States
Companies based in Scottsdale, Arizona
Education companies established in 1965
Vocational education in the United States
Private equity portfolio companies
Companies listed on the New York Stock Exchange
For-profit universities and colleges in the United States